Mireius dentitibiis is a species of beetle in the family Carabidae, the only species in the genus Mireius.

References

Pterostichinae